Burswood may refer to several places.

Places in Perth, Western Australia
 Burswood, Western Australia, the suburb
 Burswood Entertainment Complex
 Burswood railway station

Places in New Zealand
 Burswood, New Zealand, a suburb of Auckland